WTOW (1320 AM) was a radio station broadcasting a Gospel music format. Licensed to Washington, North Carolina, United States, the station was owned by Shabach Media Group. As of June 1, 2018, the station went silent.

History

2003 license renewal fine
Former owner James Rouse/The Minority Voice was issued a $13,000 fine for failure to renew WTOW's license in a timely manner in August 2003 leading up to its expiration date of December 1, 2003. The fine was issued on April 2, 2008.

License deletion
On July 31, 2019, WTOW's license was deleted by the FCC due to being silent over a one-year period.

See also
List of radio stations in North Carolina

References

External links
FCC Station Search Details: DWTOW (Facility ID: 31856)
FCC History Cards for WTOW (covering 1959-1979 as WJMG / WEEW)

TOW
Radio stations established in 1961
1961 establishments in North Carolina
Defunct radio stations in the United States
Radio stations disestablished in 2019
2019 disestablishments in North Carolina
Defunct religious radio stations in the United States
TOW